Eskandar (also Romanized as Eskandar; also known as Iskandār and Iskender) is a village in Meydan Chay Rural District, in the Central District of Tabriz County, East Azerbaijan Province, Iran. At the 2006 census, its population was 1,377, in 336 families.

References 

Populated places in Tabriz County